Voice of Silence may refer to:

 Voice of Silence (1953 film), an Italian movie directed by Georg Wilhelm Pabst
 Voice of Silence (2013 film), an Iranian movie directed by Mohammad Hadi Naeiji
 Voice of Silence (2020 film), a South Korean film directed by Hong Eui-jeong

See also
The Voice of the Silence, an 1889 book by Helena Petrovna Blavatsky
Silent Voices (disambiguation)